WLFN (105.1 FM), branded as 105.1 The Train, is a radio station licensed to serve Waverly, the county seat of Humphreys County, Tennessee, United States. The station, established in 1972, is owned by Mike Parchman, through licensee Consolidated Media LLC, with primary studios in Dickson, Tennessee and secondary studios and sales offices in Clarksville, Tennessee.

History
The station began broadcast operations on September 26, 1972, with 3,000 watts of effective radiated power on a frequency of 104.9 MHz from an antenna  in height above average terrain. The station was assigned the call sign WVRY by the Federal Communications Commission (FCC). The station was built by Humphreys County Broadcasting Company as an FM sister station to WPHC (1060 AM).

In March 1984, license holder Robert M. McKay, Jr., (doing business as Humphreys County Broadcasting Company) agreed to sell WVRY and WPHC to Mid-Cummberland Communications, Inc. The FCC approved the joint sale on May 24, 1984, and the deal was completed on July 12, 1984.

The Commission issued the station a construction permit to make these changes on November 23, 1988, with a scheduled expiration date on May 23, 1990. Construction and testing were completed in June 1989, so a new broadcast license application to cover these changes was submitted. The FCC granted the new license on June 14, 1990.

In November 1996, Mid-Cumberland Communications, Inc., reached a deal to sell WVRY and WPHC to Reach Satellite Network, Inc. The FCC approved the combo deal on November 27, 1996, and the sale was completed on December 12, 1997. Within days, the new owners sold AM station WPHC to Canaan Communications, Inc., an area religious broadcaster.

In December 1999, the stockholders of Reach Satellite Network agreed to sell the company and its broadcast assets to Salem Communications. At the time of the sale, Reach Satellite Network held the broadcast licenses for WVRY and WBOZ (104.9 FM in Woodbury, Tennessee). The FCC approved the transfer of control on February 15, 2000, and completion of the transaction took place on March 31, 2000. On March 9, 2007, Salem sold WVRY to Grace Broadcasting Services, for a total of $900,000. The deal gained FCC approval on May 23, 2007, and was completed on May 29, 2007. On May 1, 2013, WVRY was sold to JWL Communications for $1 million.

In 2016, the station was acquired by MP Media for an undisclosed purchase price. After briefly stunting as Trump 105.1, playing songs vaguely related to Donald Trump, the station flipped to country legends as 105.1 The Wolf.

On February 7, 2018, Ashland City-based WVWK (formerly WJNA, now WNTC) began simulcasting WVWF's programming. That station has since relaunched separate original programming.

On June 10, 2019, the station changed its call sign to WBWR. On June 14, 2019, Mike Parchman's Consolidated Media LLC consummated the purchase of the station from Cumberland Radio Partners for $1. WBWR changed its call sign back to WVWF on June 18, 2019, to WVWB on January 9, 2020, and to WOWQ on July 26, 2021.

On December 22, 2021, WOWQ changed its format from classic country to adult hits, branded as “105.1 The Train”. The call sign changed again to WLFN in June 3, 2022.

Previous logo

References

External links

LFN
LFN
Humphreys County, Tennessee
Radio stations established in 1972
1972 establishments in Tennessee
Adult hits radio stations in the United States